Surehban or Surrehban may refer to:
 Surehban, Kurdistan
 Surehban, Sanandaj, Kurdistan Province
 Surehban, West Azerbaijan
 Surehban, Urmia, West Azerbaijan Province